Silas McBee "Sike" Williams (June 9, 1888 – December 8, 1944) was an Americancollege football player and coach as well as a lawyer.

Sewanee
Williams was a prominent end for the Sewanee Tigers of Sewanee:The University of the South, selected second-team for its All-Time football team, He stood 5'9" and weighed 150 pounds.

1909
Williams was selected All-Southern and captain of the SIAA champion 1909 team.

Harvard
He also attended Harvard Law School, receiving his LL. B. in 1913.

Law school football
There in a game of all-stars from Michigan, Sewanee, and Vanderbilt against Harvard, including Germany Schulz at center and Vanderbilt coach Dan McGugin at left guard, Williams played on Harvard's team against his former quarterback Chigger Browne. That game ended in a scoreless tie. A second game was played between Harvard Law School and a different "All-Southern" team.  Williams scored the only points in the 5 to 0 victory when he ran in a touchdown off a Stephen Galatti pass.

Chattanooga
Williams served as the head football coach at the University of Chattanooga—now known as the University of Tennessee at Chattanooga—from 1919 to 1921, compiling a record of 10–15–2.

Death
Williams died on December 8, 1944, at the Robert Fulton Hotel in Atlanta, after suffering a heart attack.

Head coaching record

References

1888 births
1944 deaths
20th-century American lawyers
American football ends
Chattanooga Mocs football coaches
Sewanee Tigers football coaches
Sewanee Tigers football players
All-Southern college football players
Harvard Law School alumni
Sportspeople from Greenville, South Carolina
Coaches of American football from South Carolina
Players of American football from South Carolina